Kentucky Route 1426 (KY 1426) is a  state highway in Kentucky. KY 1426's western terminus is at U.S. Route 23 (US 23) in Banner, and the eastern terminus is at US 119 east-northeast of Meta

Major intersections

References

1426
Transportation in Floyd County, Kentucky
Transportation in Pike County, Kentucky